The second HMS Mersey was commissioned in 1858, just six years after the first Mersey had been broken up. She and her sister ship the Orlando were the longest wooden warships built for the Royal Navy. At 336 feet in length, HMS Mersey was nearly twice the size of HMS Victory, the flagship of Admiral Horatio Nelson at the Battle of Trafalgar. At 5643 tons displacement, she was certainly a large and impressive looking ship in her day. She was heavily armed, and in comparison to many of her counterparts was quite fast with an approximate speed of 12½ knots, achieving 13½ on trials.

The length, the unique aspect of the ship, was actually an Achilles' heel of the Mersey and Orlando. The extreme length of the ship put enormous strains on her hull due to the unusual merging of heavy machinery, and a lengthy wooden hull, resulting in her seams opening up. They were pushing the limits of what was possible in wooden ship construction:

In 1875 Mersey was laid up and sold for breaking.

Notes

Bibliography

External links
 A picture of HMS Mersey can be found here

Mersey-class frigates
Steam frigates of the Royal Navy
Frigates of the Royal Navy
1858 ships